The Chuviscar River, is a river of Mexico. It is a tributary of the Rio Conchos, which in turn flows into the Rio Grande. It flows through the Mexican state of Chihuahua, directly through the state capital of Chihuahua City.

It starts in a place called Cañada del Chivato, in the Chihuahua Municipality. One of its tributaries is the Sacramento River.

See also
 List of rivers of Mexico
 List of tributaries of the Rio Grande

References

Atlas of Mexico, 1975.
The Prentice Hall American World Atlas, 1984.
Rand McNally, The New International Atlas, 1993.

Rio Conchos
Tributaries of the Rio Grande
Rivers of Chihuahua (state)